Hughes Reef (Mandarin) is a reef in Union Banks in the Spratly group of islands, South China Sea claimed by the PRC (China), the ROC (Taiwan), the Philippines, Malaysia, and Vietnam. It is only above water at low tide. 

The PRC has reclaimed land on the reef, bringing its area to 7.6 hectares, and occupied the reef.  The reef has a lighthouse on top of a two storied defence outpost.

Geographical features
On 12 July 2016, the tribunal of the Permanent Court of Arbitration concluded that Hughes Reef is, or in its natural condition was, exposed at low tide and submerged at high tide and, accordingly, its low-tide elevations do not generate an entitlement to a territorial sea, exclusive economic zone or continental shelf.

Military development
In late 2016, photographs emerged which suggested that Hughes Reef has been armed with anti-aircraft weapons and a CIWS missile-defence system.

See also
 Great wall of sand
 Nine-dotted line

References

External links
 Asia Maritime Transparency Initiative Island Tracker

Reefs of the Spratly Islands
Reefs of China
Union Banks
Artificial islands of Asia